The 1996 United States presidential election in Connecticut took place on November 5, 1996, as part of the 1996 United States presidential election. Voters chose eight representatives, or electors to the Electoral College, who voted for president and vice president.

Connecticut was won by incumbent Democratic President Bill Clinton, who took 52.83% of the vote over Republican Senator Bob Dole of Kansas, who took 34.69%, a victory margin of 18.14%. The Reform Party candidate, Texas billionaire Ross Perot, finished in third, with 10.02% of the popular vote.

Clinton's decisive win was indicative of a major shift toward the Democratic Party throughout the Northeast in the 1990s. Connecticut had previously been a Republican-leaning swing state, with Republicans winning it in the 1970s and 80s but Clinton carrying it by a fairly close 42-36 plurality in 1992. However, in 1996 Clinton not only won by double digits, but swept every county in the state, including traditionally Republican Fairfield County and Litchfield County, the first Democrat to do so since Lyndon B. Johnson in 1964. Clinton's gains proved enduring, as every county except Litchfield voted Democratic in all elections that followed until Donald Trump won Windham County in 2016. Consequently, the state has become a reliably blue state in presidential elections, with Democratic nominees winning the state by double digits in every election since.

As of 2020, this was the most recent presidential election in which the towns of Morris and Thomaston were carried by the Democratic nominee. This was the first election since 1912 where the Democratic nominee won the town of Orange. This is the most recent election where Connecticut voted more Republican than Maine.

Results

By county

Counties that flipped from Republican to Democratic
Fairfield (Largest city: Bridgeport)
Litchfield (Largest city: Litchfield)

See also
 United States presidential elections in Connecticut

Notes

References

Connecticut
1996
1996 Connecticut elections